Eileene Lucia Parsons OBE (born 5 July 1930) is a former British Virgin Islands Government Minister. She was one of the first woman ministers and the first deputy speaker of that government.  In local press she is frequently referred to as being a "cultural icon" for her work with the BVI Heritage Dance Company and other local cultural groups.

Life
Parsons was born on the island of Tortola but some time later she went to live with her mother's sister Constancia Parrott. She and her aunt moved to St Thomas where she attended Charlotte Amalie High School.

Parsons's higher education continued in Puerto Rico where she earned a diploma in dressmaking and attended Oswego State Teachers College (now State University of New York at Oswego) where she studied Industrial Arts and Spanish. She took an associate degree at the College of Virgin Islands (now University of the Virgin Islands) and BSc in hospitality management with a focus on destination promotion at Florida International University.

Work
Parsons taught at schools in the American and British Virgin Islands as well as working as a secretary to high-profile administrators at the college and the Department of Education. For five years she was the registrar and bursar at H. Lavity Stoutt Community College. In her spare time she was involved with a number of cultural and sporting initiatives as well as writing for the local paper and co-writing a book on the history of the performing arts.

Parsons also served as Cultural Officer from 1984-1989 and has been active in culture and sports.  She founded the Community Singers and the BVI Heritage Dance Company.  She has also written extensively for publication in local newspapers and co-authored the book 1834 - 1984 - One Hundred and Fifty years of Achievement and Development through the Performing Arts.

She also chaired the BVI's Festival Committee from 1975-83.

Politics
Parsons contested the elections in 1983, 1986 and 1990 but it was not until the British Virgin Islands general election in 1995 she was finally successful.  She joined the opposition for five years and then joined the Virgin Islands Party and sat on the Government back benches for another two. In 1997 she became the Minister of Health, Education and Welfare. She stood again at the 1999 elections and became the deputy Chief Minister as well as continuing at the Ministry of Health, Education and Welfare until 2000.
      
At the next election she stood for the National Democratic Party and became Deputy Speaker.

Parsons was appointed an OBE in 2013. There is a lounge at the H. Lavity Stoutt Community College which is named in her honour.

Honours and recognition
The Eileene L. Parsons Auditorium at the H. Lavity Stoutt Community College was named in honour of Parsons.

Comments

Since her retirement Parsons has occasionally come into the public eye in relation to controversial comments that she has made.  In January 2015 she reportedly cursed at Andrew Fahie, the House of Assembly member for the 1st district, and then refused to apologise.  In February 2016 in response to a question about a reported 137% budget overrun on public project which had been the subject of much public criticism she suggested that this was normal and it should not be a source for concern.

Electoral history

References

British Virgin Islands politicians
Living people
National Democratic Party (British Virgin Islands) politicians
Virgin Islands Party politicians
1930 births
Florida International University people